The Feuchtwanger Cent was a "German Silver" private token coin circulated by Lewis Feuchtwanger during the 1830-1840s in the U.S. Three cent varieties were also available, though not as plentiful as the one cent tokens.

The tokens were originally created as patterns to demonstrate a new type of metal for coinage, however when these proposals failed, they were temporarily used by the public during depressions to accommodate a small change shortage.

History

Lewis Feuchtwanger (born in Fürth, Bavaria on January 11, 1805) received a doctorate at the university of Jena and then moved to New York City.  He was primarily a mineralogist, metallurgist, and chemist, but also worked as a physician and was a member of a number of learned societies.  He wrote four books on mineralogy and chemicals.

In 1837, to alleviate the need for small change during the Hard Times, Feuchtwanger created tokens made of argentan (commonly known as German Silver), an alloy made of copper, nickel, zinc, tin and trace metals. It was considerably cheaper to produce than the extraction of copper for the government minted half-cents and cents.

The Hard Times, an especially rough period of economic recession following the dissolution of the Second Bank of the United States, was known for massive hoarding of small change. Much of the small change circulating at this time (roughly 1837–1844) was composed of clunky copper half-cents and cents privately produced or various cut and whole silver coins of foreign origin. In fact, it would not be until 1857, that Congress would enact into law that legal currency be coin of United States Mint origin.

In 1837, Feuchtwanger presented his one cent coins to Congress for approval as legal coinage and a cheaper substitute for copper. This was probably the first attempt to circulate "nickel" coinage in the United States. Congress denied his request, but Feuchtwanger persisted in his production and circulation. Laws banning private coinage were not passed until 1864.  Between 1837 and 1844 thousands of Feuchtwanger cents came out of his New York City pharmacy. To the discerning collector over a dozen different die casts have been identified, affecting the relative rarity of each specimen found.

Aside from one cent tokens, in 1864 Feuchtwanger also produced three cent tokens which are considered extremely rare, as few specimens have survived. Feuchtwanger was also noted for producing stamp-like casts featuring his common theme of a pouncing eagle attacking a snake.

See also
 Hard times token
 Civil War token

Notes and references
 - Article on Lewis Feuchtwanger
 - PCGS Coinfacts Page for Feuchtwanger 1C, followed by pages for other of his strikes.
 - 2011 Silver Commemorative Feuchtwanger Cent as issued by the Grove Minting Company

Historical currencies of the United States
Exonumia
Numismatics
Token coins
Eagles on coins